University of Redwood is a fictitious college claiming to be located in Oregon in the United States.  It can be confused with Reed College in Portland, Oregon, or the College of the Redwoods in Eureka, California.

The Redwood website copies the Reed website, except it substitutes the institution's name.  However, on at least the About page, the copiers failed and at one point left the Reed name intact.  The street address and phone numbers for Reed's Cooley Art Gallery remain intact on the Redwood site. At one point, the entire faculty directory of Reed was listed on the Redwood site. While Reed was founded by Simeon and Amanda Reed, Redwood was founded by Simeon and Amanda Redwood.

As first reported by Inside Higher Ed, at least one man living in China created the Redwood site in June 2010. Reed first discovered the Redwood site in October 2010 and sent letters to Redwood's internet service provider under the Digital Millennium Copyright Act demanding that the copyrighted materials be taken down.  The site was removed within a few days.  However, the site was restored in November when its owners claimed that the infringing materials were removed. Reed officials rediscovered the site in January 2011; as of February 2011 they once again were able to have the site taken down.  According to Martin Ringle, chief technology officer of Reed, the site could be used to collect admission application fees fraudulently from Asian students. Upon receiving an application, "a shrewd scammer could wait several weeks, then issue a rejection letter, and the student would never know" that Redwood did not exist. Ringle claimed he found Redwood mentioned on Asian higher-education blogs.

The Redwood website lists a mailing address in Torrance, California, that belongs to a mail-forwarding company. That company forwards the mail to China. It also lists a fax number with a 650 area code, which is assigned to the Bay Area south of San Francisco, California.

See also 
Accepted
Miscovich emeralds hoax

References

External links
University of Redwood official website

Fictitious entries
Fraudsters
Internet hoaxes
Unaccredited institutions of higher learning in the United States
Fictional American universities and colleges
Hoaxes in China
2010 hoaxes